Arnis is a Latvian masculine given name and may refer to:
Arnis Balčus (born 1978), Latvian photography and video artist 
Arnis Mednis (born 1961), Latvian singer
Arnis Rumbenieks (born 1988), Latvian track and field athlete and Olympic competitor
Arnis Vecvagars (born 1974), Latvian basketball player and coach
Arnis Zaļkalns (died 2014), Latvian convicted murderer and suspected murderer of a 14-year-old English girl, Alice Gross

Latvian masculine given names